Brachyseps punctatus is a species of skink endemic to Madagascar.

References

Reptiles of Madagascar
Reptiles described in 1993
Brachyseps
Taxa named by Christopher John Raxworthy
Taxa named by Ronald Archie Nussbaum